Lisa Sabino (born 26 July 1986) is a former professional tennis player who played for Italy and Switzerland.

Career summary
Sabino won 17 singles and 34 doubles titles on the ITF Circuit. Her career-high WTA rankings are No. 315 in singles, achieved on 1 December 2008, and 292 in doubles, set on 10 August 2009.

The best juniors ranking she reached is No. 73, and she also played the Roland Garros junior competition.
In 2013, she played for Switzerland at the XXVII Universiade in Kazan, Russia, where she won the bronze medal in mixed doubles.

ITF Circuit finals

Singles: 32 (17 titles, 15 runner-ups)

Doubles: 65 (34 titles, 31 runner-ups)

References

External links
 
 

1986 births
Living people
Italian female tennis players
Swiss female tennis players
Universiade medalists in tennis
Swiss people of Italian descent
Universiade bronze medalists for Switzerland
Medalists at the 2013 Summer Universiade
People from Mendrisio
Sportspeople from Ticino